General Villegas Partido is the northeasternmost partido of Buenos Aires Province in Argentina.

Famous residents
Manuel Puig (1932–1990), Argentine Writer

Settlements
General Villegas (pop. 16,270)
Piedritas, (pop. 1,822)
Emilio V. Bunge, (pop. 1,595)
Coronel Charlone, (pop. 1,403)
Banderaló, (pop. 1,315)
Cañada Seca, (pop. 743)
Villa Sauze, (pop. 581)
Santa Regina, (pop. 533)
Villa Saboya, (pop. 327)
Santa Eleodora, (pop. 250)
Massey Est. Elordi, (pop. 76)
Pichincha, (pop. 24)

Partidos of Buenos Aires Province
States and territories established in 1877